37th SS Volunteer Cavalry Division "Lützow" ( was a unit in the Waffen-SS of Nazi Germany unit of World War II. It was formed in February 1945, consisting of remnants of SS Cavalry Division Florian Geyer and SS Cavalry Division Maria Theresia, in addition to mostly under-age German, Hungarian Volkdeutsche, and ethnic Hungarian recruits. The division was intended to have three cavalry regiments of two battalions each, but due to lack of men and equipment it could only field two understrength regiments as its main combat units.

Initially the division was commanded by SS-Oberführer Waldemar Fegelein, but in March he was replaced by SS-Standartenführer Karl Gesele. The unit saw action against Soviets as a part of the 6th Panzer Army during the final weeks of war, before surrendering to Americans in Austria in May. It was named after the Prussian general Adolf von Lützow.

Commanders
SS-Standartenführer Waldemar Fegelein  (February 1945 - March 1945)
SS-Standartenführer Karl Gesele  (March 1945 - May 1945)

See also
List of German divisions in World War II
List of Waffen-SS divisions
List of SS personnel

References

Footnotes

Bibliography

37
Military units and formations established in 1945
Cavalry divisions of the Waffen-SS
Military units and formations disestablished in 1945